Emilio Baiada (January 12, 1914 in Tunis – May 14, 1984 in Modena) was an Italian mathematician.

Education and career
He studied at the Scuola Normale Superiore in Pisa, where he graduated with highest honors in June 1937 along with Leonida Tonelli, with whom he worked as an assistant from 1938 to 1941, when he left for the war. In 1945 he began to teach analysis, theory of functions, calculus and rational mechanics at the Scuola Normale. In 1948 he obtained a degree in Analysis; his Ph.D. thesis was written under the direction of Tonelli and Marston Morse.

In 1949 he moved first to University of Cincinnati, where he worked with scientists like Otto Szász and Charles Napoleon Moore, and then to Princeton University, where he worked with Morse.
In 1952 he obtained the chair of analysis of the University of Palermo, where he taught until 1961 before transferring to the University of Modena, where he re-launched the Institute of Mathematics and developed its Library and Mathematical Seminar.

Contributions
He published more than 60 papers on differential equations, Fourier series and the series expansion of orthonormal functions, topology of varieties, real analysis, calculus of variations and the theory of functions.

Recognition
Baiada won the Michel prize for the best thesis in Pisa and the Whiting Award in 1940 for "contributions on subjects of calculus of variations".

Notes

1984 deaths
1914 births
20th-century Italian mathematicians
People from Tunis
Scuola Normale Superiore di Pisa alumni
Academic staff of the University of Palermo
Academic staff of the University of Modena and Reggio Emilia